The voiceless alveolar nasal is a type of consonant in some languages. The equivalent X-SAMPA symbol is n_0.

Features

Features of the voiceless alveolar nasal:

 There are four specific variants of :
 Dental, which means it is articulated with either the tip or the blade of the tongue at the upper teeth, termed respectively apical and laminal.
 Denti-alveolar, which means it is articulated with the blade of the tongue at the alveolar ridge, and the tip of the tongue behind upper teeth.
 Alveolar, which means it is articulated with either the tip or the blade of the tongue at the alveolar ridge, termed respectively apical and laminal.
 Postalveolar, which means it is articulated with either the tip or the blade of the tongue behind the alveolar ridge, termed respectively apical and laminal.

Occurrence

See also
 Index of phonetics articles

Notes

References

External links
 

Alveolar consonants
Dental consonants
Postalveolar consonants
Nasal consonants
Pulmonic consonants
Voiceless consonants